Ivan Quintans (born 15 October 1989 in Schaan) is a retired Liechtensteiner footballer. His father is from Dumbría, Spain, while his mother is Croatian.

International career
He was a member of the Liechtenstein national football team and holds 31 caps, making his debut in a friendly against Hungary on 11 November 2011.

References

1989 births
Living people
Liechtenstein people of Croatian descent
Liechtenstein people of Galician descent
Liechtenstein footballers
Liechtenstein international footballers
FC Vaduz players
Association football fullbacks